Lionel Michael Lowry Barnwell (born 12 August 1943 in Crewkerne) is an English former first-class cricketer who played for Cambridge University, Somerset and Eastern Province.

A nephew of John Barnwell, who played cricket for Somerset before and after the Second World War, Michael Barnwell was educated at Repton and Christ's College, Cambridge.

At cricket, Barnwell was a middle-order right-handed batsman and an occasional right-arm medium-pace bowler. After captaining the first XI at Repton in 1963, he played four times for Cambridge University in 1965 and 1966 without gaining a regular place, and six times for Somerset in 1967 and 1968. His only seasons of regular first-class cricket were for Eastern Province in South Africa when he opened the innings for a side that included the Pollock brothers and Tony Greig. His one century in top-class cricket came in his only List A match: 124 against Orange Free State in the quarter-final of the Gillette Cup in 1970–71. He left first-class cricket at the end of the 1970–71 season.

Barnwell joined the Royal Air Force Secretarial Branch and received the Sword of Merit at the conclusion of his officer training in 1975. From 1976 to 1981, he played in and often captained the Combined Services teams that played the National Cricket Association's Young Cricketers teams in one-day matches at Lord's.

References

External links

1943 births
Living people
People from Crewkerne
English cricketers
Cambridge University cricketers
Somerset cricketers
Eastern Province cricketers
People educated at Repton School
Alumni of Christ's College, Cambridge
Royal Air Force officers
20th-century Royal Air Force personnel
Military personnel from Somerset